By Divine Right is a lost 1924 American silent drama film directed by Roy William Neill and starring Mildred Harris, Anders Randolf and Elliott Dexter.

Synopsis
Mildred a young stenographer takes shelter at a mission run by Austin Farrol after escaping from attempts to seduce her by her unscrupulous employer Trent.

Cast
 Mildred Harris as Mildred
 Anders Randolf as 	Trent
 Elliott Dexter as 	Austin Farrol
 Sidney Bracey as The Hireling
 Jeanne Carpenter as 	Trent Baby
 Grace Carlyle as Mrs. Trent
 DeWitt Jennings as Tug Wilson

References

Bibliography
 Connelly, Robert B. The Silents: Silent Feature Films, 1910-36, Volume 40, Issue 2. December Press, 1998.
 Munden, Kenneth White. The American Film Institute Catalog of Motion Pictures Produced in the United States, Part 1. University of California Press, 1997.

External links
 

1924 films
1924 drama films
1920s English-language films
American silent feature films
Silent American drama films
American black-and-white films
Films directed by Roy William Neill
Film Booking Offices of America films
1920s American films